William Caulfeild may refer to:

William Caulfeild, 2nd Baron Caulfeild (1587–1640), Baron Caulfeild, Irish Master-General of the Ordnance
William Caulfeild, 1st Viscount Charlemont (1624–1671), Irish peer, Custos Rotulorum of Armagh and Tyrone
William Caulfeild (1665–1737), Irish lawyer
William Caulfeild, 2nd Viscount Charlemont (died 1726), Viscount Charlemont, Irish soldier and MP for Charlemont
William Caulfeild (British Army officer) (died 1767), British soldier responsible for the construction of roads